Peter Paul Mehl (21 April 1912 – 6 May 1972) was a German international footballer. He was part of Germany's squad at the 1936 Summer Olympics.

References

1912 births
1972 deaths
Footballers from Düsseldorf
Association football midfielders
German footballers
Olympic footballers of Germany
Germany international footballers
Footballers at the 1936 Summer Olympics
Fortuna Düsseldorf players